Vasily Alekseyevich Gorodtsov (23 March (O.S. 11 March), 1860, village of Dubrovichi, Ryazan Oblast - 3 February 1945, Moscow) was a Russian archaeologist. 

From the 1880s, Gorodtsov excavated the Ob River area. From 1903 to 1929, he worked in the Russian Historical Museum, where he became head of the archaeological department in 1906. He co-founded the Society of Friends of the Historical Museum in 1919, and acted as its chairman from 1922.

Gorodtsov was an honorary or full member of more than twenty scientific organisations connected with archaeology, natural sciences or folklore. He participated in excavations until the late 1930s and accumulated a record of over 200 publications. He was awarded Distinguished Scientist of the Soviet Union in 1929 and doctor of historical sciences in 1935. Vasily Gorodtsov was also the recipient of the Order of Lenin.

References

External links
 
biography entry (Russian Historical Museum)

1860 births
1945 deaths
Russian archaeologists
Recipients of the Order of Lenin